The Distinguished Honor Award is an award of the United States Department of State.  Similar versions of the same award exist for the former U.S. Information Agency, Arms Control and Disarmament Agency,  and USAID.  It is presented to groups or individuals in recognition of exceptionally outstanding service or achievements of marked national or international significance.

The award consists of a gold medal set and a certificate signed by an assistant secretary, an official of equivalent rank or the Chief of Mission.  Due to the demanding nature of the criteria, the award is not routinely issued; only three non-Ambassadorial rank Foreign Service Officers have ever received an individual award.

Criteria

The following criteria are applicable to granting a Distinguished Honor Award:

 Exceptionally outstanding service to the agencies or the U.S. Government resulting in achievements of marked national or international significance;
 Exceptionally outstanding service and/or leadership in the administration of one or more agency programs that results in the highly successful accomplishment of mission, or in a major attainment of objectives or specific accomplishment to meet unique or emergency situations; and
 Outstanding accomplishments over a prolonged period that involve the exercise of authority or judgment in the public interest.

Nominating and approval procedures

Nominations for State and USAID employees are submitted on Form JF-66, Nomination for Award, through supervisory channels to the Joint Country Awards Committee for review and recommendation to the Chief of Mission for final action.

Nominations initiated in Washington are submitted to the appropriate area awards committee for final action. For USAID, nominations initiated in Washington are reviewed by the USAID bureau/office with final approval by the appropriate assistant administrator or office head.

Military use

Upon authorization, members of the U.S. military may wear the medal and ribbon in the appropriate order of precedence as a U.S. non-military personal decoration.

Notable recipients
Tex Harris, Foreign Service Officer
Peter W. Chiarelli, General, U.S. Army
David H. Petraeus, General, U.S. Army
 Richard Armitage, former Deputy Secretary of State, 2001-2005
 Ambassador Charles W. Yost, career U.S. diplomat, United States Ambassador to the United Nations
 Ambassador L. Paul Bremer, former head of the Coalition Provisional Authority in Iraq, 2003–2004
 Ambassador Eric J. Boswell, current Assistant Secretary for Diplomatic Security
 Ambassador Lino Gutiérrez, former U.S. Ambassador to Argentina, 2003-2006
 Ambassador James Franklin Collins, former U.S. Ambassador to the Russian Federation, 1997–2001
 Ambassador John R. Davis Jr., former U.S. Ambassador to Poland, 1988-1990
 Jacques Paul Klein, United Nations Transitional Administrator (UNTAES)
 Brett H. McGurk, Director for Iraq, United States National Security Council
 Harry B. Harris Jr., Admiral, US Pacific Command
 Paul J. Selva, General, Vice Chairman of the Joint Chiefs of Staff
 James B. Story, Charge d’Affaires to Venezuela
 George Jacobson, mission coordinator at the Embassy of the United States, Saigon
Alec Ross, author and former Senior Advisor for Innovation to Secretary of State Hillary Clinton

References

See also 
Awards of the United States Department of State
Awards and decorations of the United States government
United States Department of State
U.S. Foreign Service

Awards and decorations of the United States Department of State
United States Department of State